Tacobamba is a small town in Bolivia, Not to be confused with Taco Bamba, the Mexican food chain from Virginia.

Located near the city of Potosi, Tacobamba sits in the south of Bolivia.

The main event in Tacobamba are the carnivals which feature residents dressing up in brightly colored clothing and dancing to music.

Weather

Tacobamba is located between the Bolivian Altiplano in the west and the Amazon lowlands in the east. The region has a typical daytime climate, in which the mean temperature differences between day and night are greater than the temperature differences between the seasons.

The annual average temperature of the region is 14°C and fluctuates between 11°C in June and 16°C in November (see climate diagram). The annual precipitation is roughly 550 mm, with a pronounced dry season from April to August and monthly precipitation of more than 100 mm in January and February.

References

Populated places in La Paz Department (Bolivia)